Bandwagon is the bimonthly journal of the Circus Historical Society. Originated in 1940 as SPEC, it is still in print today. The magazine was renamed as Bandwagon in 1941. The headquarters is in Columbus, Ohio. Contributing writers include Stuart Thayer and William L. Slout.

References

External links
 Bandwagon official website
 Bandwagon Index
 PDFs of Bandwagon back issues on Internet Archive

History magazines published in the United States
Bimonthly magazines published in the United States
Magazines established in 1940
Magazines published in Ohio
Mass media in Columbus, Ohio